Mohanpur is a village in Khanna Tehsil in Ludhiana district of Punjab State, India.

History
Mohanpur can trace its beginning in the 18th century, when Bhai Guddar Ji established the village.

Mohanpur has a significant number of families with the "Bhandal" surname. The village consists mainly of Sikh religion practitioners, but there are some Hindu, Muslim, and Christian people.

Location

Mohanpur is located 38 km to the east of District headquarters Ludhiana. 8 km from Khanna. 68 km from State capital Chandigarh.

Transport

Transportation is quite good connected with road just adjacent to NH1,(DELHI-LUDHIANA) Highway Regular private bus services operate between khanna and the various surrounding villages and towns, as well as the Tempo three-wheeler service. These operate from both the Bija Road Bus Stop and Mohanpur Road Bus Stop. Services connect with some Interstate and State Bus Transport at khanna. Other Interstate and State buses can be caught from ludhiana Bus Stand For a personal service, a minivan taxi service can be hired from the Khanna city.

By Rail Khanna railway station, Chawapall railway station are the very nearby railway stations to Mohanpur. However, Ludhiana Jn Rail Way Station is major railway station 40 km near to Mohanpur

The nearest airport is Chandigarh Domestic Airport, Chandigarh & Sri Guru Ram Dass Jee International Airport, located in Amritsar. The Indira Gandhi International airport offers regional air travel as well as destinations to all over the world.

General Information

Telephone STD Code—01628/
Postal Code—141401/
Police Station - Sadar Khanna/
Post Office—Mohanpur.

Education

Green Grove Public School (aff. CBSE)

Primary Govt. School

Khalsa Model School (Pvt)

Colleges near Mohanpur

Mata Ganga Khalsa College For Women, Manji Sahib

Gulzar Group Of Institutes

Sanjeevani Group of Institutes

kular College of Nursing

A S college, Khanna

  
Villages in Ludhiana district